Wellington Saunders Whymms (born 6 April 1972) is a former Bahamian sprinter who ran the second leg for the Bahamian men's 4 × 100 m team at the 2000 Summer Olympics. The team narrowly missed advancing past its first heat.

References

1972 births
Living people
Bahamian male sprinters
Athletes (track and field) at the 2000 Summer Olympics
Olympic athletes of the Bahamas